Events in the year 1887 in Brazil.

Incumbents
Monarch – Pedro II
Prime Minister –  João Alfredo Correia de Oliveira

Events
June – The Clube Militar, founded by Benjamin Constant and Deodoro da Fonseca, holds its first meeting.
Francisco de Paula Rodrigues Alves, future President of Brazil, becomes president of the province of São Paulo.
Italian ethnologist Guido Boggiani travels through the interior of Brazil, Bolivia and Paraguay to document the lives of Indians in the region.
Maragogi is granted the status of a town.

Births
March 5 – Heitor Villa-Lobos, composer (died 1959)
April 19 – Lucílio de Albuquerque, painter (died 1939)
May 15 – José Joaquim Moniz de Aragão, diplomat (died 1974)
May 16 – Maria Lacerda de Moura, anarchist, feminist, journalist and writer (died 1945)

Deaths
date unknown – William Hadfield, British writer, specialist in Brazil (born 1806)

References

 
1880s in Brazil
Years of the 19th century in Brazil
Brazil
Brazil